Eupithecia extremata is a moth in the family Geometridae. It is found on the Iberian Peninsula, Italy, Germany, Poland, Austria, Slovakia, Hungary and most of the Balkan Peninsula. It is also found in Turkey, Israel and Georgia.

The wingspan is about 16 mm.

Subspecies
Eupithecia extremata extremata
Eupithecia extremata hangayi Vojnits, 1977

References

Moths described in 1787
extremata
Moths of Europe
Moths of Asia
Taxa named by Johan Christian Fabricius